StealthNet is an anonymous P2P file sharing software based on the original RShare client, and has been enhanced. It was first named 'RShare CE' (RShare Community Edition). It use the same network and protocols as RShare.

In 2011 a fork named DarkNode is release, but one year later the website is cleared with the source code.

History 
Development was stopped in March 2011, with version 0.8.7.9, with no official explanation on the web site.

In 2012, the developers had an incident with the software Apache Subversion, a part of the source code of StealthNet was lost : versions 0.8.7.5 (February 2010) to 0.8.7.9 (October 2010). However the source code is still available as files.

In 2017 it was forked into version 0.8.8.0.

Features 
Some of the features of StealhNet:
 Mix network (use for the pseudo anonymous process)
 Easy to use (same principles as eMule)
 Multi-source download : 'Swarming' (Segmented file transfer)
 Resumption of interrupted downloads
 Can filter the file types searched (allowing to search only among the videos/archives/musics/... files)
 SNCollection: this type of file contain a list of files shared into StealthNet. Like the "eMule collection" file and Torrents files
 Point-to-Point traffic encryption with AES standard process (Advanced Encryption Standard, 256 bits)
 EndPoint to EndPoint traffic encryption with RSA standard (1024 bits)
 Strong file hashes based on SHA-512 algorithm
 Anti-flooding measures 
 Text mode client available for OS with Monosupport like Linux, OSX and others

Drawbacks 
 Has no support for UPnP (Universal Plug and Play), the user must open a port number (ie: 6097) into his router.
 Anonymity is unproven.
 The source code contains no documentation at all.
 The encryption level (AES 256 bits and RSA 1024 bits in the v0.8.7.9) that was strong in the 2000s is now medium since the 2010s.

See also

 Anonymous P2P
 I2P

References

External links
  Official web site
  StealthNet upgrade (2017)

Anonymous file sharing networks
Free file sharing software
File sharing software for Linux
Windows file sharing software
Free software programmed in C Sharp